Asheville School is a private, coeducational, university-preparatory boarding school in Asheville, North Carolina founded in 1900. The campus sits on  amid the scenic Blue Ridge Mountains and currently enrolls 295 students in grades nine through twelve.  The campus was named by Architectural Digest magazine in 2018 as the most beautiful private school campus in North Carolina. The school was ranked the seventh best boarding school in the U.S. by independent education organization TheBestSchools.org.

History

Asheville School was founded in 1900 by Charles Andrews Mitchell and Newton Mitchell Anderson. Previously, the pair founded the University School in Cleveland, Ohio in 1890. Fifty-three male boarding students from grades five through twelve called "forms" were enrolled that first year.

Academics

Asheville School's academic course of study stresses a core curriculum of the humanities, sciences, mathematics, foreign language, and the arts.

Asheville School has a humanities program that integrates the study of literature, history, religion, art, music, architecture, film, and dance into a series of four year-long courses: Ancient Studies, World Studies, European Studies, and American Studies. English and history teachers may team-teach these courses, sometimes with the assistance of the school's music teacher and other guest lecturers. The academic program focuses heavily on writingand culminates in a final research project known as the Senior Demonstration. The project requires seniors to produce two papers on a topic of their choosing and complete an oral defense for twenty minutes.

Mountaineering

Asheville School has a mountaineering program that participate in backpacking, rock climbing, whitewater kayaking, snow skiing, caving, and mountain biking. Many students take mountaineering as an afternoon activity for daily on-campus instruction and practice. Off-campus trips are frequently offered to places such as Looking Glass Rock in Pisgah National Forest, the Tuckaseegee and French Broad rivers, and the Tsali Recreational area. All new students go on at least one overnight camping trip during their first year at Asheville School that introduces students to the school's mountaineering program. Early leaders of the outdoors program were mountaineering leaders Pop Hollandsworth and Vince Lee.

Community life

The Asheville School student body is made up of approximately 80% boarding students and 20% day students. The school has students from twenty-six states and thirteen countries. Roughly a quarter of the students receive need-based financial aid. The school has about the same number of males and females.

Boarding students live in one of three dormitories: Lawrence Hall, Anderson Hall, and Kehaya House.

The school community gathers several times a week for chapel services and convocations. Sixth formers are required to deliver a ten-minute chapel or convocation talk on a topic of their choosing, an event that (along with the Senior Demonstration) represents the capstone of a student's career at Asheville School. Following the talk, the entire student body exchanges handshakes with and congratulates the speaker.

Traditions

The football rival of Asheville School (the Blues) is Christ School (the Greenies). At Asheville School, the rivalry game is preceded by a week of festivities that culminates in a pep rally the evening before the Blues take the field. The Asheville School/Christ School rivalry represents North Carolina's longest-running high school athletic rivalry.

Each September, the entire student body heads to Camp Rockmont in Black Mountain, North Carolina for a day of recreation. Traditionally, a game of hide-and-seek between the headmaster and the members of the sixth form class takes place. The headmaster attempts to conceal himself somewhere on the grounds of the camp, and the seniors attempt to discover his location so that they may toss him into the camp lake.

Notable alumni
Notable alumni of Asheville School include:

 Pete Dye – golf course designer
 James Hormel – philanthropist, LGBT activist, and diplomat who served as the United States Ambassador to Luxembourg from 1999 to 2001
 H. C. Robbins Landon – musicologist, journalist, historian and broadcaster
 Samuel Curtis Johnson, Jr. – businessman; fourth generation of his family to lead S. C. Johnson & Son, Inc.
 Charles P. Ries – former U.S. diplomat
 Edward Gaylord – Oklahoma billionaire businessman, media mogul and philanthropist
 Langdon Brown Gilkey – Protestant ecumenical theologian
 Marisha Pessl – writer known for her novels Special Topics in Calamity Physics, Night Film, and Neverworld Wake
 Harvey Samuel Firestone Jr. – was chairman of the board of the Firestone Tire and Rubber Company
 Stephen A. Jarislowsky – Canadian business magnate, investor, and philanthropist
 James Arthur "Art" Pope – North Carolina businessman, philanthropist, attorney and former government official
 Roy Sangwoo Kim – singer-songwriter and radio presenter
 José Antonio González Anaya – economist who served as the minister of finance and public credit of Mexico
 Roberts Blossom – theatre, film and television character actor, and poet
 Bellamy Young – actress and singer, best known for her role as Melody "Mellie" Grant in the ABC drama series Scandal
 Perla Haney-Jardine – actress
 Jennifer Pharr Davis – long distance hiker
 Ralph Millard – plastic surgeon who developed several techniques used in cleft lip and palate surgeries

References

Boarding schools in North Carolina
Educational institutions established in 1900
Historic districts on the National Register of Historic Places in North Carolina
National Register of Historic Places in Buncombe County, North Carolina
Private high schools in North Carolina
School buildings on the National Register of Historic Places in North Carolina
Schools in Buncombe County, North Carolina
1900 establishments in North Carolina